A truss arch bridge combines the elements of the truss bridge and the arch bridge. The actual resolution of forces will depend upon the design. If no horizontal thrusting forces are generated this becomes an arch-shaped truss, essentially a bent beam – see moon bridge for an example. If horizontal thrust is generated but the apex of the arch is a pin joint, this is termed a three-hinged arch. If no hinge exists at the apex, it will normally be a two-hinged arch.
In the Iron Bridge shown below, the structure of each frame emulates the kind of structure that previously had been made of wood. Such a wood structure uses closely fitted beams pinned together, so the members within the frames are not free to move relative to one another, as they are in a pin-jointed truss structure that allows rotation at the pin joint. Such rigid structures (which impose bending stresses upon the elements) were further developed in the 20th century as the Vierendeel truss.

Some bridges of this type

Maria Pia Bridge (1877), Gustave Eiffel's pioneering two-hinge arch.
Hurricane Deck Bridge (1936), the last remaining truss-type bridge on Lake of the Ozarks in central Missouri.
I-35W Mississippi River bridge (1967) bridge that collapsed in 2007 in Minneapolis, Minnesota, USA.
Navajo Bridge and newer (1995) bridge of the same general construction, each built as unsupported cantilevers joined with a central pin.

Truss
Truss bridges by type